The Gross Schinhorn (also known as Punta di Valdeserta) is a  mountain of the Lepontine Alps, located on the Swiss-Italian border.

A lower summit (2,917 m) named Klein Schinhorn lies north of the Gross Schinhorn. The two summits are referred as the Schinhörner.

References

External links
 Gross Schinhorn on Hikr

Mountains of the Alps
Mountains of Switzerland
Mountains of Italy
Italy–Switzerland border
International mountains of Europe
Mountains of Valais
Lepontine Alps
Two-thousanders of Switzerland